The 340th Weapons Squadron is a United States Air Force unit assigned to the USAF Weapons School.  It is stationed at Barksdale Air Force Base, Louisiana.  The 340th is assigned to the 57th Wing, at Nellis Air Force Base, Nevada. The mission of the squadron is to provide Boeing B-52 Stratofortress instructional flying.

On 3 February 1942, Captain Paul Tibbets (of Enola Gay fame) was given command of a new squadron that would later become the 340th Bombardment Squadron. The 340th Bomb Squadron was involved in combat missions in both the European and Mediterranean theaters from 1942 through 1945. The most notable of these were the Operation Tidal Wave raids on Hitler’s largest oil refinery in Ploiești, Romania. During the Vietnam War, B-52 crews from the 340th BS participated in the Linebacker offensives over the skies of North Vietnam. In August 1990 the 340th deployed aircrews for Operation Desert Storm.

History

World War II

Established in early 1942 as a Boeing B-17 Flying Fortress heavy bomb squadron; trained under Third Air Force in Florida.   Deployed to European Theater of Operations (ETO) in  mid-June 1942, being assigned to VIII Bomber Command in England.  The squadron was one of the first B-17 heavy bomb squadrons in the ETO.   During the summer of 1942, engaged in long range strategic bombardment of enemy military, transport and industrial targets, primarily in France and the Low Countries with limited fighter escorts.

Reassigned to the new Twelfth Air Force in England, being deployed to Algiers as part of the initial Operation Torch forces that arrived in North Africa.  Squadron aircraft carried Triangle-O on tail.  Engaged in bombardment of enemy targets in Algeria and Tunisia as part of the North African Campaign, and attacked enemy strong points around Tunis as part of the Tunisian Campaign.  Continued heavy bomb missions of enemy targets in Sicily and Southern Italy and in late 1943 was reassigned to new Fifteenth Air Force formed in Southern Italy.  From airfields around Foggia, conducted long-range strategic bombardment missions over Southern Europe and the Balkans of enemy targets until the German Capitulation in May 1945.   Demobilized squadron personnel and aircraft were sent to the United States for reclamation in the fall of 1945; being inactivated in Italy in October.

Cold War
Reactivated in August 1946 under Strategic Air Command.  Equipped with B-29 Superfortresses and participated in numerous exercises, operational readiness inspections, and overseas deployments.  Became part of SAC nuclear deterrent force.  Began upgrading to the new Boeing B-50 Superfortress, an advanced version of the B-29 in 1949. The B-50 gave the unit the capability to  carry heavy loads of conventional weapons faster and farther as well as being designed for atomic bomb missions if necessary.

By 1951, the emergence of the Soviet Mig-21 interceptor in the skies of North Korea signaled the end of the propeller-driven B-50 as a first-line strategic bomber.  Received B-47 Stratojet jet bombers in 1955 and despite initial difficulties, the Stratojet became the mainstay of the medium-bombing strength of SAC all throughout the 1950s, deployed frequently to North Africa and England for REFLEX exercises.   Began sending  its B-47s to AMARC at Davis-Monthan in 1959 when the aircraft was deemed no longer capable of penetrating Soviet airspace.

Reassigned to Blytheville Air Force Base, Arkansas and equipped with Boeing B-52G Stratofortress strategic bombers in 1960.   Stood nuclear alert with the B-52G, although deployed aircrew to forward bases in the Western Pacific during the Vietnam War which flew Operation Arc Light and Linebacker I combat missions over Indochina;  aircrews participated in the December 1972/January 1973 Linebacker II missions over the Hanoi-Haiphong area of North Vietnam.   On 15 August 1973, after months of committing most of the wing's people and resources to the conflict, crew E-21 had the distinction of flying the last B-52 mission over a target in Cambodia. This marked the end of the United States' strategic bombing in Southeast Asia. Crews returned to the United States to training and alert status.

Deployed aircraft and crews to the 806th Bombardment Wing (Provisional) at RAF Fairford, England in February 1991, engaging in combat operations over Iraq and Kuwait during Operation Desert Storm.  Inactivated in early 1992 after the end of the Cold War.

Bomber training
The Air Force Chief of Staff directed the creation of the 'B-52 Division, USAF Weapons School' on 1 October 1989 as the Strategic Weapons School, graduating the first class in April 1990. In 1992, with the activation of Air Combat Command, the B-52 Division was reborn as part of the USAF Weapons School, eventually becoming 'Detachment 2, USAF Weapons School. The 340th Bombardment Squadron was reactivated as the 340th Weapons Squadron, USAF Weapons School on 3 February 2003

Lineage
 Constituted as the 340th Bombardment Squadron (Heavy) on 28 January 1942
 Activated on 3 February 1942
 Redesignated 340th Bombardment Squadron, Heavy on 6 March 1944
 Inactivated on 29 October 1945
 Redesignated 340th Bombardment Squadron, Very Heavy on 15 July 1946
 Activated on 4 August 1946
 Redesignated 340th Bombardment Squadron, Medium on 28 May 1948
 Redesignated 340th Bombardment Squadron, Heavy on 1 October 1959
 Redesignated 340th Bomb Squadron on 1 September 1991
 Inactivated on 7 January 1992
 Redesignated 340th Weapons Squadron on 24 January 2003
 Activated and organized on 3 Feb 2003, assuming resources of B-52 Division, USAF Weapons School

Assignments
 97th Bombardment Group, 3 February 1942 – 29 October 1945
 97th Bombardment Group, 4 August 1946 (attached to 97th Bombardment Wing after 10 February 1951)
 97th Bombardment Wing, 16 June 1952
 97th Operations Group, 1 September 1991 – 7 January 1992
 USAF Weapons School, 3 February 2003 – present

Stations

 MacDill Field, Florida, 3 February 1942
 Sarasota Army Air Field, Florida, 29 March–16 May 1942
 RAF Polebrook (AAF-110), England, 11 June–10 November 1942
 Maison Blanche Airport, Algiers, Algeria, c. 13 November 1942
 Tafaraoui Airfield, Algeria, c. 22 November 1942
 Biskra Airfield, Algeria, 26 December 1942
 Chateau-dun-du-Rhumel Airfield, Algeria,  8 February 1943
 Pont du Fahs Airfield, Tunisia, 12 August 1943
 Depienne Airfield, Tunisia, 14 August 1943
 Cerignola Airfield, Italy, c. 14 December 1943
 Amendola Airfield, Italy, 17 January 1944
 Marcianise Airfield, Italy, c. October–29 October 1945
 Smoky Hill Army Air Field, Kansas, 4 August 1946 (deployed to Mile 26 Airfield (later, Eielson Air Force Base), Alaska, 4 November 1947 – 12 March 1948
 Biggs Air Force Base, Texas, 17 May 1948
 Deployed to RAF Lakenheath, England, 5 March–4 June 1952; Andersen Air Force Base, Guam, 16 December 1953 – c. 15 Mar 1954
 Detachments at RAF Lakenheath, England, and Yokota Air Base, Japan, April 1954 – 1 April 1955
 Deployed to RAF Upper Heyford, England, 5 May–4 July 1956; Eielson Air Force Base, Alaska, 24 September – 2 November 1957
 Blytheville Air Force Base (later Eaker Air Force Base), Arkansas, 1 July 1959 – 7 January 1992
 Barksdale Air Force Base, Louisiana, 3 February 2003 – present

Aircraft

 Boeing B-17 Flying Fortress, 1942–1945
 Boeing B-29 Superfortress, 1946–1950 
 Boeing B-50 Superfortress, 1950–1954
 Boeing KB-29 Superfortress, 1954–1955
 Boeing ERB-29 Superfortress, 1954–1955
 Boeing RB-50 Superfortress, 1954–1955
 Boeing B-47 Stratojet, 1955–1959
 Boeing B-52 Stratofortress, 1960–1991

See also

 Boeing B-17 Flying Fortress Units of the Mediterranean Theater of Operations 
 List of B-52 Units of the United States Air Force

References

Notes
 Explanatory notes

 Citations

Bibliography

 
 
 
 
 

0340
Military units and formations in Louisiana